Triplophysa intermedia is a species of stone loach in the genus Triplophysa. The species has only been found in Hulun Lake in Inner Mongolia, China; but is believed to appear in other locations as well since fish in this genus are typically found in running water.

References 

I
Freshwater fish of China
Endemic fauna of China
Taxa named by Karl Kessler
Fish described in 1876